Syed Modi Railway Stadium is a cricket stadium in Gorakhpur, Uttar Pradesh, India. The ground has hosted two Ranji matches when home team Railways cricket team played against Vidarbha cricket team in 1982. Again the stadium was used in 1983 when home team Railways cricket team played against Rajasthan cricket team
The stadium was established and governed by Indian Railways and was named as Railway Stadium. But later it was named after former Indian badminton player Syed Modi.

References

External links 
 Cricketarchive
 Wikimapia
 Cricinfo

Sports venues in Uttar Pradesh
Cricket grounds in Uttar Pradesh
Multi-purpose stadiums in India
Sport in Gorakhpur
Sports venues completed in 1967
1967 establishments in Uttar Pradesh
Buildings and structures in Gorakhpur
20th-century architecture in India